In Japan, the  carries National Route 2 under the Kanmon Straits. At the time of its construction, it was the longest undersea highway in the world. It opened in 1958. The endpoints are in Shimonoseki, Yamaguchi and Moji-ku, Kitakyūshū. According to a United Press report at the time, 53 workers were killed during its construction, and it was second only to the Mersey Railway tunnel in length for an underwater tunnel.   

Work on the Kanmon Roadway Tunnel began in 1937, but was halted in 1939 by World War II. Work resumed in 1952, and the tunnel was officially opened on March 9, 1958.   The event was marked by a Japanese commemorative postage stamp. Major repairs were conducted in 2008.

Under terms of Article 46.3 of Road Act, driving by vehicles that carry dangerous goods are either prohibited or limited strictly.

Coordinates 

 Shimonoseki entrance for cars: 
 Shimonoseki entrance for pedestrians and bicycles: 
 Moji entrance for cars: 
 Moji entrance for pedestrians and bicycles:

See also
 Kanmon Rail Tunnel

References 

Road tunnels in Japan
Undersea tunnels in Asia
Roads in Yamaguchi Prefecture
Roads in Fukuoka Prefecture